Casey Paul Fossum (born January 6, 1978) is a former professional pitcher. Previously, he played for the Boston Red Sox (2001–2003), Arizona Diamondbacks (2004), Tampa Bay Devil Rays (2005–2007), Detroit Tigers (2008), and New York Mets (2009) of Major League Baseball, and the Hanshin Tigers (2010) of Nippon Professional Baseball. He bats and throws left-handed.

Personal life
Casey Fossum is currently retired from playing Big League baseball and resides in his hometown, Waco, Texas.  Casey is married to Kadette Cooper Fossum, a '97 Midway graduate and an '01 Texas Tech Alumna.  Casey is involved in his community in helping youth baseball players through the Little League and Select Baseball teams. He lives in Waco, TX, with his wife and their indoor mini horses Duey, Houdini, and Lieuy.  He also helps his wife, Kadette, rescue and retrain retired thoroughbred racehorses.

Early years and college
Fossum was born in Cherry Hill, New Jersey.  He attended Midway High School in Waco, Texas where he was a two time Central Texas Player of the Year, 1st team all state in '95 and '96, Baseball America High School second team All American in '96 with 210 strikeouts in 105 innings. Casey then attended Texas A&M University where he was also a Freshman All American and still holds the all-time career strikeout record in a single season and career. He also helped lead the Aggies to the 1999 College World Series in Omaha, Nebraska. He earned All-Big 12 honors in both 1998 and 1999, highlighted by a 12–7 record and 3.64 earned run average (ERA) during his junior campaign, establishing a single-season school mark with 162 strikeouts. Fossum also won the C. E. "Pat" Olsen Outstanding Pitcher Award in 1999 and was a second team All-American in 1998.

Major League Baseball career

1999-2003, Boston Red Sox
Fossum was selected by the Boston Red Sox in the 1999 June draft as the 18th pick in the first supplemental round (48th overall), and started his major league career in 2001.

During three years with Boston, Fossum moved between the bullpen and the rotation, compiling 14 victories with two saves in 75 games. (Coincidentally, both of Fossum's major league saves preserved wins for John Burkett (May 29, 2002 and July 21, 2003)). After a recurrence of tendinitis in his pitching shoulder, he underwent surgery in September 2003. Two months after the surgery, he was sent to the Arizona Diamondbacks in the trade that brought Curt Schilling to the Red Sox.

2004, Arizona Diamondbacks
In 2004, Fossum played for the Arizona Diamondbacks and, for the first time in his career, was used exclusively as a starting pitcher. He missed the first  weeks to recover from surgery, but finished third on the Diamondbacks staff in starts (27), innings pitched (142) and strikeouts (117).

2005-07, Tampa Bay Devil Rays

Before the 2005 season, Fossum was traded to the Tampa Bay Devil Rays for outfielder José Cruz Jr.

In 2006, Fossum was 6-6, with a 5.33 ERA in 25 starts.

On August 10, 2007, the Devil Rays released Fossum. At the time of his release, his ERA was 7.70 in 40 games.

2007, San Diego Padres
He signed a minor league contract with the San Diego Padres on August 22, but never pitched for them.

2008, Detroit Tigers
On January 24, 2008, Fossum signed a minor-league contract with an invitation to spring training with the Pittsburgh Pirates. At the end of spring training, he declined his assignment to the minor leagues and elected to become a free agent. On April 9, 2008, Fossum signed a minor league contract with the Detroit Tigers. On June 3, his contract was purchased by the Tigers, after the DFA of right-handed pitcher Francisco Cruceta, and he was added to the active roster.

2009, New York Mets
On January 16, 2009, Fossum signed a minor league contract with the New York Mets.  He pitched three innings for the Mets, allowing one run, and was then designated for assignment.

2009, New York Yankees
On May 2, 2009, Fossum signed a minor league contract with the New York Yankees, making his first start for the AAA Scranton/Wilkes-Barre Yankees that day. On June 24, Fossum opted out of his contract and became a free agent.

2009, Chicago Cubs
On July 3, 2009, Fossum signed a minor league contract with the Chicago Cubs.

2011, New York Mets
On February 9, 2011, Fossum signed a contract with the New York Mets.

2012, Baltimore Orioles
On February 2, 2012, Fossum signed a minor league contract with the Baltimore Orioles. He was released on April 16.

Pitching style

Fossum throws three different overhand curveballs. The first curveball is a tight-rotating 1–7 curveball that has a velocity in the low to mid 70s, but a pitch that Fossum struggles to throw effectively over the plate for strikes and at times remains too flat.  The second curveball is also a 1–7 pitch, has a moderate break while clocking in between 65 and 70 MPH, and can effectively throw for strikes.  The third curveball is a 12–6 curveball with a large break, making it difficult to hit. While the pitch has been a very effective pitch for him to use, often landing for strikes or causing popouts, he regulates the pitch as a change-of-pace pitch to prevent batters from becoming used to it. Fossum dubbed this pitch the "Fossum flip", and it is essentially a form of the eephus pitch.  He also has a decent fastball in the 88–92 mph range and a changeup that while effective, does not drop as well as the average changeup.  Fossum is also a good fielder and has an above-average pickoff move.

Fossum's biggest knock is his stamina. Weighing in at 160 lbs, Fossum has a somewhat violent throwing style and has been injured a few times in his career.  In 2004, he missed the first five weeks of the season with a sore elbow, and near the end of the 2005 season his effectiveness was reduced to what he and Lou Piniella attributed to lower back pain.  For a relief pitcher, Fossum is also very good at holding runners on base.  In 2004, baserunners managed to steal 15 bases out of 23 attempts (a 65.2% success rate), and in 2005, only 10 basestealers out of 14 attempts were successful (a 71.4% rate).  The league averages in those seasons were 69% and 70% respectively, but relievers tend to allow higher rates than starters.

References

External links

1978 births
Living people
Arizona Diamondbacks players
Boston Red Sox players
Detroit Tigers players
Lowell Spinners players
Major League Baseball pitchers
Baseball players from New Jersey
New York Mets players
Pawtucket Red Sox players
People from Cherry Hill, New Jersey
People from Waco, Texas
Portland Beavers players
Tampa Bay Devil Rays players
Scranton/Wilkes-Barre Yankees players
Texas A&M Aggies baseball players
Toledo Mud Hens players
Tucson Sidewinders players
Buffalo Bisons (minor league) players
American expatriate baseball players in Japan
Hanshin Tigers players
Sportspeople from Camden County, New Jersey
Lancaster Barnstormers players